Paula Gooder (born 1969) is a British theologian and Anglican lay reader, who specialises in the New Testament. She is Canon Chancellor of St Paul's Cathedral. She has previously taught at two theological colleges, Ripon College Cuddesdon and The Queen's Foundation, served as Theologian in Residence for the Bible Society (2013–2017), and as Director of Mission, Learning and Development in the Diocese of Birmingham (2017–2018). She is a freelance writer and speaker.

Early life and education
Gooder was born in 1969 in Manchester, England. From 1988 to 1992, she studied theology at Worcester College, Oxford, graduating with a first class Bachelor of Arts (BA) degree. She completed her Doctor of Philosophy (DPhil) degree at The Queen's College, Oxford in 1998. Her doctoral thesis was titled "Only the third heaven?: 2 Corinthians 12:1-10 and heavenly ascent".

Career
From 1995 to 2001, Gooder was a tutor in Biblical Studies at Ripon College Cuddesdon, an Anglican theological college near Oxford. She then taught at The Queen's Foundation, an ecumenical theological college in Birmingham, while attending conferences or giving lectures independently. She left The Queen's Foundation in 2007 to become a full-time freelance writer and lecturer. From September 2013 to 2017, she was Theologian in Residence for the Bible Society: this became a full-time role in 2016. In March 2017, she joined the Church of England Diocese of Birmingham as Director of Mission, Learning and Development. In October 2018, it was announced she would be leaving her role in the Diocese of Birmingham to return to freelance work. In February 2019, it was announced that Gooder would be the next chancellor of St Paul's Cathedral in the Diocese of London; she was licensed to the post on 23 February 2019.

Church of England
Gooder is a reader (lay minister) in the Church of England. From 2005 to 2015, she was an elected member of the General Synod of the Church of England. Since 2011, she has been a member of the Anglican–Roman Catholic International Commission.

Selected works

References

External links
 Personal website
 Christian Today - Five reasons why Paula Gooder is going to influence your theology

21st-century Anglican theologians
Living people
British Anglicans
Evangelical Anglican theologians
Women Christian theologians
Alumni of Worcester College, Oxford
Alumni of The Queen's College, Oxford
21st-century British theologians
Anglican lay readers
Staff of Ripon College Cuddesdon
1969 births
Members of the General Synod of the Church of England